Urbandub is a Filipino rock band from Cebu City, Philippines. Since its inception in 2000, the band's line-up consisted of Gabby Alipe, John Dinopol, Lalay Lim, and JanJan Mendoza who joined in 2003.

Urbandub is the first indie band in the Philippines to release albums nationwide with the assistance of a major label. The label also featured Urbandub in a Pinoy rock compilation entitled "FULL VOLUME", with a remake of Sade's "No Ordinary Love". The band recently garnered the attention of fans throughout Southeast Asia with a tour in Singapore.

The band posted on Facebook stating that they will be having their last concert with their original line-up on May 9, 2015. Bass guitarist and back-up vocalist Lalay Lim and drummer JanJan Mendoza left the band to prioritize their families afterwards.

In 2016, Alipe and Dinopol reunited to reform Urbandub (also dubbed as "Gab and John") along with bass player Russ Manaloto and drummer Sam Saludsong. In 2018, Lim and Mendoza returned after a hiatus from the band.

Background

Birth (2001)
Urbandub's debut album suffered distribution problems due to the lack of support from major record companies. Later in the year, their first single "Come" was released and accompanied with a music video funded by Sonic Boom productions. The following singles from the album included "Boy", "Give", and "Would You Go". Although only a modest success at the time, the album managed to earn the band some degree of notoriety within Cebu City. Birth is raw and heavy, with obvious influences of Deftones and other experimental rock bands. Though the album's production quality was rough, it emerged as a successor to the scene that dominated independent radio in the mid 1990.

Influence (2003)
With the release of their second effort, INFLUENCE on Lighter Records (Backyard Studio), Urbandub took on a new form, changing their sound with a new drummer (From Jed Honrado to Jerros Dolino). Jerros continued to record tracks with band, but left sometime in 2003 when he decided to leave for undisclosed reasons. The band then recruited JanJan Mendoza. It was the sound in this album that clearly defined the steps that Urbandub would start to take. INFLUENCE includes radio-released singles such as "Gone" and, their most famous release to date, "Soul Searching", which won the award as Best Song of the Year in the NU107 Rock Awards 2003. The album also won as the Album of the Year Award in the NU107 Rock Awards 2004. They also released a single called "A New Tattoo". They dedicate this song to a former friend Juan Paulo Hidalgo.

During this time, the band also experienced the dangers brought by rival frat/gang wars in Cebu as guitarist John Dinopol was mistakenly shot at by a motorcycle riding headhunter of an undisclosed fraternity. Although not in critical condition, his left arm was injured and had to recover for a few months. Amidst the dilemma, Urbandub enlisted Faspitch guitarist Russell Manaloto and Mong Alcaraz of Chicosci to fill in for John, who was still active with the band despite the injury. John recovered in less than a year and even went on to shoot the "A New Tattoo" video and perform live with metal braces on his arm.

Embrace (2005)
With the 2005 release of the album Embrace, the band has kept Lighter Records as their management arm and guide. In line with their ideals, EMI allowed them the creative freedom to record their album on their home soil of Cebu. Added to that, they have been able to maintain their independent principles while taking major steps into the scene that has awaited their new sound. Embrace's singles, "Alert The Armory", "Frailty", "Endless, A Silent Whisper" and the pop anthem "First of Summer" culled from the third album Embrace, became one of the most played songs on local radio. Serving up the band's usual host of poetic metaphors through guitar riffs and screaming drums single after single came rolling like Urbandub's name is glued on top of the charts.

Under Southern Lights (2007)
After more than 10,000 albums sold, thousands of miles traveled around the country and some dizzying highs and lows, an energized Urbandub returned with Under Southern Lights released on June 15, 2007.

Under Southern Lights, the latest album, boasts 10 tracks of Urbandub's new approach to their own brand—their brilliance shines throughout a melodious rock tune and diverse songwriting.

Asked about the album title, "The name is our tribute to Cebu City where we came from and where we did most of the writing for the album. It's also a metaphor for our families in Cebu, being that they're our inspiration and guiding light," Alipe said.

The album starts with a shot, with that first single "Anthem" – an indelible guitar hook and ferocious drums charge forth as Urbandub's trademark mix of airtight vocal harmonies.

If you have compiled all Urbandub songs into your own greatest hits album, you probably get the impression of "change". For a band like them, change is never that good. Urbandub is growing but not changing. They may be going to perform in a bigger arena, but they'll still going to sweat the same. And still be going to produce the songs like we've known them for. "We wanna try to reach out to more people with this album," says Gabby.

The Apparition (2009)

In 2009, after ending their contract with EMI, urbandub signed with a new label MCA MUSIC and released their fifth and most experimental album entitled "The Apparition" on November 28, 2009

The writing took place again in Cebu, the band's homecourt, with the band renting a house up the mountains and turning it into a home studio for 2 months. after which, they returned to Manila and recorded again in Tracks Studio with their Under Southern Lights producer Angee Rozul. The first few prints of the album included a cover of Depeche Mode's song "Home", which, along with their cover of Sade's "No Ordinary Love", exhibited the band's eclectic taste in music. The first single off the album was the song "Gravity", a song that carries the band's trademark heavy riffing balanced with melodies and harmonies that are rarely found in Pinoy rock music.

Esoteric (2013)

On September 20, 2013. the band released their sixth album (and most recent, before their last gig with the original line-up in 2015), spawned the single "Never Will I Forget" that according to frontman Gabby Alipe, dedicated to their fans (called Dubistas) that they invited some of their loyal fans to record the gang shout parts of the song.

Hiatus and reformation

The band held their 'farewell' concert entitled "Endless" on May 9, 2015, a rainy Saturday night held at Metrotent Convention Center in Metrowalk, Ortigas. Later on the same year, Gabby Alipe briefly performed as a solo artist.

In 2016, the band went active again but performing as a trio, then later as a quartet (Gabby on guitar and vocals, John on guitar, Russ Manaloto of Faspitch on bass, and Sam Saludsong on drums).

On February 25, 2018, the original lineup of the band came together to play their songs at 70s Bistro in a Not-So-Secret Gig and on February 26, 2018 at 19 EAST Bar and Grill. It was attended by 750 strong Urbandub followers also known as Dubistas. The night was a big blast as the band belted out their hits since 2000 to present.

Members
Current members
Gabby Alipe - lead vocals, rhythm guitar (2000–2015; 2016–present)
John Dinopol - lead guitar, backing vocals (2000–2015; 2016–present)
Lalay Lim-Geronimo - bass guitar, backing vocals (2000–2015, 2018–present)
JanJan Mendoza - drums (2003–2015, 2018; on hiatus)

Touring, studio, live, session members
Russ Manaloto - rhythm guitar, backing vocals (2018–present); bass guitar (2016–2018)
Sam Saludsong - drums (2016–present)
Eo Marcos - drums (2019)

Former members
Jed Honrado - drums (2000–2002)
Jerros Dolino - drums (2002–2003)

Discography

Studio albums
 Birth (2001)
 Influence (2003)
 Embrace (2005)
 Under Southern Lights (2007)
 The Apparition (2009)
 Esoteric (2013)

EP Album
 Sending A Message (2011)

Singles

Videography
From Birth
"Come"
From Influence
"A New Tattoo"
From Embrace
"Alert the Armory"
"First of Summer"
"Endless, A Silent Whisper"
"Frailty"
From Under Southern Lights
"Guillotine"
"Evidence"
"The Fight is Over"
From The Apparition
"Gravity"
"A Call To Arms"
"Sending a Message"
From Esoteric
"Never Will I Forget"

Awards and nominations

OTHER AWARDS:
 Gold Record Award for Outstanding sales (2007) - "EMBRACE" album (EMI)
 "Best Group" - Junk Magazine Regional Music Awards (Malaysia) - (2008)
 "Best New Artist" - 2nd SMB Cebu Music Awards (2002)

Additional information

According to the lead vocalist Gabby Alipe, behind the band's name:
Urbandub's music video "First of Summer" is about a girl rebelliously going out with her boyfriend. The band later released "Endless, A Silent Whisper", which shows the events that happened before and after what was shown in "First of Summer". Both videos were directed by Marie Jamora and were shot in three days.
Urbandub was interviewed in Animax and later on performed in a show aired on Animax called Mad Mad Fun.
The mark on Gabby Alipe's right eye isn't a scar nor a tattoo. In an interview, he stated that it is a birthmark shaped like Cebu island.
In their second live performance on MYX, Gabby Alipe stated that the Urbandub way of making their album is to put exactly ten songs.
For a short term of their name, they are labeled as "Udub", short for Urbandub.
The band's lead vocalist and rhythm guitarist Gabby Alipe makes his acting debut in the 2015 film entitled The Breakup Playlist, on which he starred alongside fellow singers Piolo Pascual And Sarah Geronimo
The genres Urbandub attributed to are Alternative metal, OPM, and Alternative rock. Musically, the band is heavily influenced by Deftones, Metallica, Nirvana, Smashing Pumpkins and Filter.

References

External links
 Urbandub profile at EMI Music Philippines
 Urbandub's official site.
 Urbandub's Facebook page.

2000 establishments in the Philippines
Cebuano rock bands
Filipino hard rock musical groups
Filipino rock music groups
MCA Music Inc. (Philippines) artists
Musical groups from Cebu City
Musical groups disestablished in 2015
Musical groups established in 2000
PolyEast Records artists
Visayan people